Cladara is a genus of moths in the family Geometridae described by George Duryea Hulst in 1896.

Species
 Cladara anguilineata (Grote & Robinson, 1867)
 Cladara atroliturata (Walker, 1863)
 Cladara limitaria (Walker, 1860)
 Cladara ustata (Christoph, 1880)

References

Trichopterygini